Elijah Higgins (born October 27, 2000) is an American football wide receiver for the Stanford Cardinal.

Early life and high school
Higgins grew up in Austin, Texas and attended Bowie High School. He was selected to play in the Under Armour All-America Game during his senior season.

College career
Higgins played in all 12 of Stanford's games, primarily on special teams, as a freshman. He had  15 receptions for 176 yards during the team's COVID-19-shortened 2020 season. Higgins led the Cardinal with 45 receptions for 500 yards during his junior season. He caught 59 passes for 704 yards and two touchdowns as a senior

Personal life
Higgins' father played college football at South Florida.

References

External links
Stanford Cardinal bio

Living people
Players of American football from Texas
American football wide receivers
Stanford Cardinal football players